Gerald Malcolm Durrell,   (7 January 1925 – 30 January 1995) was a British naturalist, writer, zookeeper, conservationist, and television presenter. He founded the Durrell Wildlife Conservation Trust and the Jersey Zoo on the Channel Island of Jersey in 1959. He wrote approximately forty books, mainly about his life as an animal collector and enthusiast, the most famous being My Family and Other Animals (1956).  Those memoirs of his family's years living in Greece were adapted into two television series (My Family and Other Animals, 1987, and The Durrells, 2016–2019) and one television film (My Family and Other Animals, 2005). He was the youngest brother of novelist Lawrence Durrell.

Early life and education 

Durrell was born in Jamshedpur, British India, on 7 January 1925. He was the fifth and youngest child (an elder sister having died in infancy) of Louisa Florence Dixie and Lawrence Samuel Durrell, both of whom were born in India of English and Irish descent. Durrell's father was a British engineer and, as was commonplace for a family of their status, the infant Durrell spent most of his time in the company of an ayah (nursemaid). Durrell reportedly recalled his first visit to a zoo in India and attributed his lifelong love of animals to that encounter.

The family moved to Britain shortly before the death of his father in 1928 and settled in the Upper Norwood, Crystal Palace, area of South London. Durrell was enrolled in Wickwood School, but frequently stayed at home, feigning illness.

Corfu 
Louisa moved to the Greek island of Corfu in 1935 with Leslie, Margaret, and Gerald, joining her eldest son Lawrence who had arrived there with his wife Nancy about a week earlier. It was on Corfu that Durrell began to collect and keep the local fauna as pets.

The family lived on Corfu until 1939, and this interval became the basis of Durrell's books My Family and Other Animals; Birds, Beasts, and Relatives; and The Garden of the Gods; plus a few short stories such as "My Donkey Sally".  The Corfu years also set the background for two TV series and one telefilm. Durrell was home-schooled during this time by various private tutors, mostly friends of his brother Lawrence.

Theodore Stephanides was a Greek-British doctor, scientist, poet, translator, and a friend of George Wilkinson, one of Durrell's tutors. He became Durrell's greatest friend and mentor, his ideas leaving a lasting impression on the young naturalist. Together, they examined Corfu's fauna, which Durrell housed in a variety of items including test tubes and bathtubs. Stephanides' daughter Alexia Mercouri (1927–2018) accompanied the two on their field trips. She stated that both families had hoped that she and Durrell would marry one day, but any such prospect was disrupted by the outbreak of war in 1939.

Other influences on Durrell during his formative years were the works of naturalists Charles Darwin, Alfred Russel Wallace, Jean-Henri Fabre and Gilbert White.

London and Whipsnade Zoo 
Durrell, his mother, his brother Leslie and their Greek maid Maria Kondos moved back to Britain in 1939 at the outbreak of the Second World War. It was difficult to find a job in the war and post-war years, especially for a homeschooled youth, but the enterprising Durrell worked as a helper at an aquarium and pet store. Some of the difficulties that he faced in this period can be found in Fillets of Plaice.

His call-up for the war came in 1943, but he was exempted from military duty on medical grounds, and asked to serve the war effort by working on a farm. After the war, Durrell joined Whipsnade Zoo as a junior or student keeper. This move fulfilled a lifelong dream: Durrell claims in The Stationary Ark that the first word that he could enunciate with any clarity was "zoo". Beasts in My Belfry recalls events of this period.

Early animal expeditions 

Durrell left Whipsnade Zoo in May 1946 in order to join wildlife collecting expeditions, but was denied a place in the voyages due to his lack of experience. His wildlife expeditions began with a 1947 trip to the British Cameroons (now part of Cameroon) with ornithologist John Yealland, financed by a £3,000 inheritance from his father on turning 21. The animals that he brought back were sold to London Zoo, Chester Zoo, Paignton Zoo, Bristol Zoo, and Belle Vue Zoological Gardens. He followed this expedition with two others, accompanied by fellow Whipsnade zookeeper Ken Smith: a repeat trip to the British Cameroon in 1949, and a trip to British Guiana (now Guyana) in 1950. On the first of these trips, he met the Fon of Bafut Achirimbi II, an autocratic West African chieftain who helped him organise future missions.

Durrell housed and fed his captives with the best supplies obtainable, not trapping animals having merely "show value" or those which would fetch high prices from collectors. These practices differed from those of other animal-collecting expeditions of the time, and he was in financial straits by the end of his third expedition. Further, he had a falling-out with George Cansdale, superintendent of the London Zoo, and Durrell was blackballed by the British zoo community and could not secure a job in most zoos. He eventually secured a job at the aquarium at Belle Vue Zoo in Manchester, where he remained for some time.

Durrell started writing humorous autobiographical accounts to raise money with encouragement and assistance from Jacquie and advice from his brother Lawrence. He did this initially because he and Jacquie were in need of money after their wedding and he had no source of income, and later he wrote in order to fund his expeditions and conservation efforts. His first book The Overloaded Ark was a huge success, causing him to follow up with other such accounts. He only made £50 from British rights (Faber and Faber), but he obtained £500 from the United States rights (Viking Press) for the book, and thus managed to raise money for a fourth expedition to South America in 1954. This, however, was undertaken during a political coup d'état in Paraguay and was unsuccessful.

Foundations for the Jersey Zoo 
The publication of My Family and Other Animals in 1956 made Durrell a notable author and brought him public recognition as a naturalist. Royalties from this book, which made best-seller lists in the United Kingdom, helped to fund Durrell's next expedition.

Durrell's growing disillusionment with the way zoos of the time were run, and his belief that they should primarily act as reserves and regenerators of endangered species, made him contemplate founding his own zoo. His 1957 trip to Cameroon for the third and last time was primarily to collect animals which would form the core collection of his own zoo.

This expedition was also filmed, it being Durrell's first experiment with making a cinematographic record of his work with animals. The success of the film To Bafut with Beagles, together with his autobiographical radio programme Encounters with Animals, made Durrell a regular with the BBC Natural History unit for decades to come, as well as generating funds for his conservation projects.

On his return from Bafut, Durrell and wife Jacquie stayed with his sister Margaret at her boarding house in the seaside resort of Bournemouth. His animals were housed in her gardens and garage on a temporary basis, while Durrell sought prospective sites for a zoo. To his dismay, both Bournemouth and Poole municipalities turned down his suggestion for a zoo. This experience provided material for his book A Zoo in My Luggage.

Zoo and the trust 

Durrell founded the Jersey Zoological Park in 1959 to house his growing collection of animals. The site for the zoo, a 17th-century manor house, Les Augres Manor, came to Durrell's notice by chance after a long and unsuccessful search for a suitable site. Durrell leased the manor and set up his zoo on the redesigned manor grounds. In the same year, Durrell undertook another, more successful expedition to South America to collect endangered species. The zoo was opened to the public in 1959 on 26 March.

As the zoo grew in size, so did the number of projects undertaken to save threatened wildlife in other parts of the world. Durrell was instrumental in founding the Jersey Wildlife Preservation Trust (now Durrell Wildlife Conservation Trust), on 6 July 1963 to cope with the increasingly difficult challenges of zoo, wildlife and habitat management.

The trust opened an international wing, the Wildlife Preservation Trust International, in the United States in 1971, to aid international conservation efforts in a better fashion. That year, the trust bought out Les Augres Manor from its owner, Major Hugh Fraser, giving the zoo a permanent home.

Durrell's initiative caused the Fauna and Flora Preservation Society to start the World Conference on Breeding Endangered Species in Captivity as an Aid to their Survival in 1972 at Jersey, today one of the most prestigious conferences in the field. 1972 also saw Princess Anne becoming a patron of the trust, an action which brought the trust into media limelight and helped raise funds.

The 1970s saw Jersey Wildlife Preservation Trust become a leading zoo in the field of captive breeding, championing the cause among species like the lowland gorilla, and various Mauritian fauna. Durrell visited Mauritius several times and coordinated large scale conservation efforts in Mauritius with conservationist Carl Jones, involving captive breeding programmes for native birds and reptiles, ecological recovery of Round Island, training local staff, and setting up local conservation facilities. This ultimately led to the founding of the Mauritian Wildlife Foundation in 1984.

Jacquie Durrell separated from and then divorced Durrell in 1979, citing his increasing work pressure, associated alcoholism and mounting stress as causes.

Durrell met his second wife, Lee McGeorge Wilson, in 1977 when he lectured at Duke University, where she was studying for a PhD in animal communication. In 1978, a year after they first met, Durrell wrote a love letter to his future wife. They married in 1979. She co-authored a number of books with him, including The Amateur Naturalist, and became the honorary director of the trust after his death.

In 1978, Durrell started the training centre for conservationists at the zoo, or the "mini-university" in his words. As of 2005, over a thousand biologists, naturalists, zoo veterinarians and zoo architects from 104 countries have attended the International Training Centre. Durrell was also instrumental in forming the Captive Breeding Specialist Group of the World Conservation Union in 1982.

Durrell founded Wildlife Preservation Trust Canada, now Wildlife Preservation Canada, in 1985. The official appeal, Saving Animals from Extinction, was launched in 1991 at a time when British zoos were not faring well and London Zoo was in danger of closing down.

In 1989, Durrell and his wife, along with David Attenborough and cricketer David Gower helped launch the World Land Trust (then the World Wide Land Conservation Trust). The initial goal of the trust was to purchase rainforest land in Belize as part of the Programme for Belize. Around this time Gerald Durrell developed a friendship with Charles Rycroft, who became an important donor of funds both for building works in Jersey (the Harcroft Lecture Theatre) and for conservation work in East Africa, Madagascar and elsewhere.

1990 saw the trust establish a conservation programme in Madagascar along the lines of the Mauritius programme. Durrell visited Madagascar in 1990 to start captive breeding of a number of endemic species like the aye-aye.

Durrell chose the dodo, the flightless bird of Mauritius that was hunted to extinction in the 17th century, as the logo for both the Jersey Zoo and the trust. The children's chapter of the trust is called the Dodo Club. Following his death, the Jersey Wildlife Preservation Trust was renamed the Durrell Wildlife Conservation Trust at the 40th anniversary of the zoo on 26 March 1999. The Wildlife Preservation Trust International also changed its name to Wildlife Trust in 2000, and adopted the logo of the black tamarin.

In A Zoo in My Luggage (1957), Durrell wrote:

To me the extirpation of an animal species is a criminal offence, just as the destruction of something else that we cannot recreate or replace, such as a Rembrandt or the Acropolis, would be.

Personal life 
On 26 February 1951, Durrell married Manchester resident Jacqueline ('Jacquie') Sonia Wolfenden after a lengthy courtship; they eloped when she was 21, because of opposition from her father. The couple initially lived in a small bedsitter in Durrell's sister Margaret's Bournemouth boarding house. Jacquie accompanied him on most of his following animal expeditions and helped found and manage the Jersey Zoo. She also authored two humorous, best-selling memoirs on the lines of Durrell's books in order to raise money for conservation efforts. They separated and then divorced in 1979, citing the pressure of his work and his alcoholism.

In 1979, Gerald married American Lee McGeorge Wilson, who met him when he gave a lecture at Duke University in North Carolina in 1977, where she was a doctoral student. He was 52 and she was 28 years old. Both were enthusiastic naturalists. They remained married until his death.

Death
A hard, outdoor life led Durrell to health problems in the 1980s. He underwent hip-replacement surgery in a bid to counter arthritis, but he also suffered from alcohol-related liver problems. His health deteriorated rapidly after the 1990 Madagascar trip. Durrell had a liver transplant in King's College Hospital on 28 March 1994, and he died of septicaemia on 30 January 1995, shortly after his 70th birthday in Jersey General Hospital. His ashes are buried in Jersey Zoo, under a memorial plaque bearing a quote by William Beebe:

The beauty and genius of a work of art may be re-conceived, though its first material expression be destroyed; a vanished harmony may yet again inspire the composer; but when the last individual of a race of living beings breathes no more, another heaven and another earth must pass before such a one can be again. (The Bird, 1906)

A memorial celebrating Durrell's life and work was held at the Natural History Museum in London on 28 June 1995. Participants included personal friends such as David Attenborough and Princess Anne.

Books 

Durrell's books have a very loose style which pokes fun at himself as well as those around him. Perhaps his best-known work is My Family and Other Animals (1956), which tells of his idyllic childhood on Corfu and was developed into two TV series and one film. It is deprecating about the whole family, especially elder brother Lawrence, who became a famous novelist. Despite Durrell's jokes at Lawrence's expense, the two were close friends all their lives.

Durrell always insisted that he wrote for royalties to help the cause of environmental stewardship, not out of an inherent love for writing. He describes himself as a writer in comparison to his brother:
The subtle difference between us is that he loves writing and I don't. To me it's simply a way to make money which enables me to do my animal work, nothing more.

Durrell was a regular contributor to magazines on both sides of the Atlantic, including Harper's, Atlantic Monthly, and the Sunday Times Supplement. He was also a regular book reviewer for The New York Times. A number of excerpts and stories from his books were used by Octopus Books and Reader's Digest Publishing, including in the Reader's Digest Condensed Books. His works have been translated into 31 languages and made into TV serials and feature films. He has large followings in Northern and Eastern Europe, Russia, Israel, and various Commonwealth countries, including India. The British Library houses a collection of Durrell's books as part of the Lawrence Durrell Collection.

Illustrators 
Durrell was a talented artist and caricaturist, but worked with numerous illustrators over the years, starting with Sabine Baur for The Overloaded Ark (published by Faber and Faber). Two of his most productive collaborations were with Ralph Thompson (Bafut Beagles, Three Singles To Adventure, The New Noah, The Drunken Forest, Encounters with Animals, A Zoo in My Luggage, The Whispering Land, Menagerie Manor) (published by Rupert Hart-Davis) and Edward Mortelmans (Catch Me A Colobus, Beasts in My Belfry, Golden Bats and Pink Pigeons) (published by Collins). The illustrations are mostly sketches of animal subjects. Ralph Thompson visited the Jersey Zoological Park during the sketching period for Menagerie Manor.

Other illustrators who worked with Durrell were Barry L. Driscoll, who illustrated Two in the Bush; Pat Marriott, who illustrated Look at Zoos; and Anne Mieke van Ogtrop, who illustrated The Talking Parcel and Donkey Rustlers.

Durrell wrote a number of lavishly illustrated children's books in his later years. Graham Percy was the illustrator for The Fantastic Flying Journey and The Fantastic Dinosaur Adventure. Toby the Tortoise and Keeper were illustrated by Keith West. His Puppy board books were illustrated by Cliff Wright.

Honours and legacy 

 Durrell was awarded the Order of the Golden Ark by Prince Bernhard of the Netherlands in 1981.
 In 1981, Durrell became a founding member of the World Cultural Council.
 Durrell received the OBE in 1982.
 The National Youth Music Theatre performed the musical theatre The Carnival of the Animals at Fort Regent, Jersey as a tribute to Gerald Durrell in 1984.
 Durrell featured in the United Nations' Roll of Honour for Environmental Achievement in 1988, becoming part of 500 people ("Global 500") to be given this honour in the period 1987–92.
 The University of Kent started the Durrell Institute of Conservation and Ecology (DICE) in 1989, the first graduate school in the United Kingdom to offer degrees and diplomas in conservation and biodiversity.
 The journal Biodiversity and Conservation brought out a special volume of the journal in tribute to Gerald Durrell, on the theme of "The Role of Zoos" in 1995, following his death.
 The Gerald Durrell Memorial Funds, launched in 1996, are granted in the field of conservation by the Wildlife Trust every year.
 The statue park in Miskolc Zoo, created a bust of Gerald Durrell in 1998. Whipsnade Zoo also unveiled a new island for housing primates dedicated to Durrell in 1998.
 The Wildlife Photographer of the Year competition, owned by the Natural History Museum and BBC Wildlife, gives the Gerald Durrell Award for the best photograph of an endangered species, starting from 2001.
 The Durrell School in Corfu, established in 2002, offers an academic course and tours in the footsteps of the Durrells in Corfu. Botanist David Bellamy conducted field trips in Corfu for the school.
 The town hall of Corfu announced in 2006 that it would rename Corfu Bosketto (a park in the city of Corfu) Bosketto Durrell, after Gerald and Lawrence Durrell as a mark of respect.
 Wildlife Preservation Canada established the Gerald Durrell Society in 2006 as recognition for individuals who have made legacy gifts.
 The Gerald Durrell Endemic Wildlife Sanctuary in the Black River Valley in Mauritius, is the home of the Mauritius Wildlife Appeal Fund's immensely successful captive breeding programme for the Mauritius kestrel, pink pigeon and echo parakeet.
 The Durrell Wildlife Park has a bronze statue of Gerald Durrell by John Doubleday, cast along with a ruffed lemur at his knee and a Round Island gecko at his feet.
 Jersey brought out stamps honouring the Jersey Wildlife Preservation Trust and Mauritius brought out a stamp based on a race of a rare gecko named after Durrell.
 The de-rodentification of Rat Island in Saint Lucia by the Durrell Wildlife Conservation Trust to create a sanctuary for the Saint Lucia whiptail lizard on the lines of Praslin Island has caused an official change in name for Rat Island. It is in the process of being renamed Durrell Island.
 The Visitors' Centre at the Belize Zoo is named the Gerald Durrell Visitors' Centre in honour of Durrell.
 Cornwall college Newquay's centre for applied zoology has two buildings, one the Durrell Building, opened by his wife Lee Durrell in 2007.

Species and homages 
 Salanoia durrelli: a carnivoran species related to the brown-tailed mongoose, from Lake Alaotra, Madagascar. (2010)
 Centrolene durrellorum: A glassfrog of the family Centrolenidae from the eastern Andean foothills of Ecuador, discovered in 2002 and described in 2005. This frog was named in honour of Gerald Durrell and his wife Lee Durrell "for their contributions to the conservation of global biodiversity".
 Clarkeia durrelli: A fossil brachiopod of the order Atrypida, from the Upper Silurian age, discovered 1982 - there is presently no reference to indicate that this species was named in honour of Gerald Durrell
 Nactus serpensinsula durrellorum: The Round Island race of the Serpent Island gecko is a distinct subspecies and was named after both Gerald and Lee Durrell for their contribution to saving the gecko and Round Island fauna in general. Mauritius released a stamp depicting the race.
 Ceylonthelphusa durrelli: Durrell's freshwater crab: A critically rare new species of Sri Lankan freshwater crab.
 Benthophilus durrelli: Don tadpole-goby: A new species of tadpole goby discovered in 2004
 Kotchevnik durrelli Yakovlev: A new species of moth of the superfamily Cossoidea from Russia
 Mahea durrelli Kment 2005: A new species of shield bug of the family Acanthosomatidae from Madagascar

Major expeditions

Bibliography

Autobiographical 
 The Overloaded Ark (Faber and Faber, 1953)
 Three Singles to Adventure (Three Tickets to Adventure) (Rupert Hart-Davis, 1954)
 The Bafut Beagles (Rupert Hart-Davis, 1954)
 The New Noah (Rupert Hart-Davis, 1955)
 The Drunken Forest (Rupert Hart-Davis, 1956)
 My Family and Other Animals (Rupert Hart-Davis, 1956) - first in the Corfu trilogy
 Encounters with Animals (Rupert Hart-Davis, 1958)
 A Zoo in My Luggage (Rupert Hart-Davis, 1960)
 The Whispering Land (Rupert Hart-Davis, 1961)
 Menagerie Manor (Rupert Hart-Davis, 1964)
 Two in the Bush (Collins, 1966)
 Birds, Beasts, and Relatives (Collins, 1969) - second in the Corfu trilogy
 Fillets of Plaice (Collins, 1971)
 Catch Me a Colobus (Collins, 1972)
 Beasts in My Belfry (A Bevy of Beasts) (Collins, 1973)
 The Stationary Ark (Collins, 1976) (mainly non-fictional content)
 Golden Bats And Pink Pigeons: A Journey to the Flora and Fauna of a Unique Island  (Collins, 1977)
 The Garden of the Gods (Fauna and Family) (Collins, 1978) - third in the Corfu trilogy
 The Picnic And Suchlike Pandemonium (The Picnic and Other Inimitable Stories) (Collins, 1979) (with some fictional short stories)
 Ark on the Move (Coward McCann, 1982)
 How to Shoot an Amateur Naturalist (Collins, 1984)
 Durrell in Russia (with Lee Durrell) (MacDonald (Publisher) (UK) / Simon & Schuster (U.S.), 1986)
 The Ark's Anniversary (Collins, 1990)
 Marrying Off Mother and Other Stories (Harper-Collins, 1991) (with some fictional short stories)
 The Aye-Aye And I: A Rescue Journey to Save One of the World's Most Intriguing Creatures from Extinction (Harper-Collins, 1992)

Non-fiction 
 Island Zoo: The Animals a Famous Collector Couldn't Part with (photographs by W. Suschitzky) (Collins, 1961)
 Look at Zoos (Hamish Hamilton, 1961)
 A Practical Guide for the Amateur Naturalist (with Lee Durrell) (Hamish Hamilton (UK) / Alfred A. Knopf (U.S.), 1982)

Fiction 
 The Donkey Rustlers (Collins, 1968)
 Rosy Is My Relative (Collins, 1968)
 The Talking Parcel (Battle for Castle Cockatrice) (Collins, 1974)
 The Mockery Bird (The Billion Dollar Brain) (Collins, 1981)
 The Fantastic Flying Journey: An Adventure in Natural History (Conran Octopus, 1987)
 The Fantastic Dinosaur Adventure: A New Adventure in Natural History (Conran Octopus, 1989)
 Keeper (Michael O'Mara Books, 1990)
 Toby the Tortoise (Michael O'Mara Books, 1991)
 Puppy's Wild Time ('Puppy Tales' No. 1) (Scott Ltd, 1993)
 Puppy's Beach Adventure ('Puppy Tales' No. 2) (Scott Ltd, 1993)
 Puppy's Pet Pals ('Puppy Tales' No. 3) (Scott Ltd, 1993)
 Puppy's Field Day ('Puppy Tales' No. 4) (Scott Ltd, 1993)

Compilations
 The Best of Gerald Durrell (edited by Lee Durrell) (Harper-Collins, 1996)

Unpublished 
 Animal Pie, an unpublished book of lighthearted animal poems and caricatures, written in the 1950s [referenced in the official Douglas Botting biography]

Contributions 
  (Foreword; the book is also dedicated to him.)
  (Foreword)

Books edited by Durrell 
 My Favourite Animal Stories (Arrow Books, 1962)

Selected articles 
 "I am sort of caged in my own zoo"

In case of simultaneous releases in many countries, the UK edition is referred to, except for companion books to TV series where both the UK and US editions are referred to.

Reference books

Biographies and other references 
 Himself and Other Animals: A Portrait of Gerald Durrell, David Hughes (1976)
 In The Footsteps of Lawrence Durrell and Gerald Durrell in Corfu (1935–39), Hilary Whitton Paipeti (1998)
 Gerald Durrell: The Authorized Biography, Douglas Botting (1999)
 "Durrelliania": An Illustrated Checklist of Inscribed Books of Lawrence Durrell and Gerald Durrell and Associated Publications, Letters and Notes in the Library of Jeremy J. C. Mallinson, edited by Jeremy Mallinson (1999)
 Amateurs in Eden: The Story of a Bohemian Marriage: Nancy and Lawrence Durrell, Joanna Hodgkin (2012)
 The Durrells of Corfu, Michael Haag (2017)
 Dining with the Durrells: Stories and Recipes from the Cookery Archive of Mrs Louisa Durrell, David Shimwell (2019)

Jersey Zoo and Durrell Wildlife Preservation Trust books 
 A Brush with Animals, Ralph Thompson (illustrations by author) (1963)
 Okavango Adventure: In Search of Animals in Southern Africa, Jeremy Mallinson (1973)
 Earning Your Living with Animals, Jeremy Mallinson (1975)
 The Facts About a Zoo: Featuring the Jersey Wildlife Preservation Trust, Jeremy Mallinson (1980)
 State of the Ark: An Atlas of Conservation in Action, Lee Durrell (1986)
 Travels in Search of Endangered Species, Jeremy Mallinson (1989)
 Gerald Durrell's Army, Edward Whitley (1992)
 Jambo: A Gorilla's Story, Richard Johnstone-Scott (1995)
 The Touch of Durrell: A Passion for Animals, Jeremy Mallinson (2009)

Companion books to TV series not co-authored by Durrell 
 Ourselves and Other Animals: From the TV Series with Gerald and Lee Durrell, Peter Evans (1987)

Books and letters by family and friends 
 Prospero's Cell: A Guide to the Landscape and Manners of the Island of Corcyra, Lawrence Durrell (1945)
 Beasts in My Bed, Jacquie Durrell (1967)
 Spirit of Place: Essays and Letters on Travel, Lawrence Durrell (1969)
 Island Trails, Theodore Stephanides (1973)
 Intimate Relations, Jacquie Durrell (1976)
 Whatever Happened to Margo, Margaret Durrell (1995) (written in the 1960s)
 The Durrell-Miller Letters: 1935-1980, Lawrence Durrell and Henry Miller (1998)
 Autumn Gleanings: Corfu Memoirs and Poems, Theodore Stephanides (2011) (apparently written in the 1970s)

Radio and filmography

Featuring the subject 
 Encounters With Animals, Radio series, BBC (1957)
 To Bafut With Beagles, TV series, BBC (1958)
 Look (Argentinian Expedition), Single episode in TV series, BBC (1961)
 Zoo Packet, TV series, BBC (1961)
 Animal Magic, early episodes in TV series, BBC (1962–1983)
 Two in the Bush, TV series, BBC (1963)
 Catch Me a Colobus, TV series, BBC (1966)
 The Garden of the Gods, TV series, BBC (1967)
 The Stationary Ark, TV series, Primedia (Canada) / Channel 4 (UK) (1975)
 Animals Are My Life, episode in the TV series The World About Us, BBC (1978)
 Ark on the Move, TV series, Primedia (Canada) / Channel 4 (UK) (1982)
 The Amateur Naturalist, TV series, CBC / Channel 4 (UK) (1983)
 Ourselves & Other Animals, TV series, Primetime Television and Harcourt Films (1987).
 Durrell in Russia, TV series, Channel 4 (UK) (1986)
 Durrell's Ark, documentary, BBC (1988)
 A Day at the Zoo with Phillip Schofield, one-hour episode featuring Durrell and Jersey Zoo (1989)
 Durrell and Other Animals, TV documentary with David Attenborough, BBC (UK) (1995)
 Gerald Durrell – Himself and Other Animals, documentary, Green Umbrella Productions (1999)
 Gerald Durrell – Jambo the Gentle Giant, documentary, Green Umbrella Productions (1999)
 Gerald Durrell – To the Island of the Aye-Aye, documentary, Green Umbrella Productions (1999)
 Safe Hands in a Wild World, documentary, Green Umbrella Productions (1999)
 Inside Jersey Zoo, re-release, UK PC Advisor magazine (2001)
 The Round Island Project, re-release, UK PC Advisor magazine (2001)
 The Mauritius Conservation Mission, re-release, UK PC Advisor magazine (2001)
  My Family and Other Animals (Radio Play), BBC Radio 4 (2010)

On the subject 
 A Memorial Celebration for the Life of Gerald Durrell (1995)
 World of Animals episode on Gerald Durrell and Jersey Zoo, Channel One, Moscow (2004)
 The Wild Life of Gerald Durrell, BBC Four (December 2005)
 Wildlife in a War Zone, using archival Durrell footage and examining the changes brought about by war in Sierra Leone, Animal Planet, May 2006
 Archive Hour with Bridget Nicholls: Discover Your Inner Durrell, BBC Radio 4 (September 2006)
 Fierce Creatures, a 1997 comedic film about a zoo in peril of being closed written by John Cleese, starring Cleese, Jamie Lee Curtis, Kevin Kline, and Michael Palin, is dedicated to Gerald Durrell and British humorist Peter Cook in the closing credits, with their photographs and dates of birth and death.

Movies 
 The Talking Parcel, Animated movie, directed by Brian Cosgrove, Cosgrove Hall (1979)
 My Family and Other Animals, 10-episode TV series, BBC (1987)
 My Family and Other Animals, Radio drama, BBC Radio 4 (2001)
 The Fantastic Flying Journey, Animated TV series, directed by Catherine Robbins and John Coates, Two Sides TV / TV Loonland (2001)
 My Family And Other Animals, the film version of his autobiography as a child (2005)
 The Durrells, 4-season TV series (26 episodes), inspired by Durrell's three autobiographical books about his family's time on Corfu, ITV (2016–2019)

Screenplays 
 Tarka the Otter, movie, directed by David Cobham (1979)

Time capsule 

A time capsule buried at Jersey Zoo in 1988 contains the following popular quote by Durrell, often used in conservation awareness campaigns:
We hope that there will be fireflies and glow-worms at night to guide you and butterflies in hedges and forests to greet you.
We hope that your dawns will have an orchestra of bird song and that the sound of their wings and the opalescence of their colouring will dazzle you.
We hope that there will still be the extraordinary varieties of creatures sharing the land of the planet with you to enchant you and enrich your lives as they have done for us.
We hope that you will be grateful for having been born into such a magical world.

Quotations
Gerald Durrell has one entry in the 8th Edition of The Oxford Dictionary of Quotations.
"Many people think conservation is just about saving fluffy animals—what they don't realise is that we are trying to prevent the human race from committing suicide."

References

External links 

 
 Durrell Wildlife Conservation Trust
 
 BBC database of Gerald Durrell
 Gerald Durrell database of films at the BFI
 
 
 

 
English naturalists
1925 births
1995 deaths
English conservationists
English children's writers
British non-fiction outdoors writers
Founding members of the World Cultural Council
Officers of the Order of the British Empire
Duke University faculty
People from Jamshedpur
Zoo directors
Zoo owners
20th-century British zoologists
20th-century English writers
20th-century naturalists